Xianyang North railway station is a railway station in Qindu District, Xianyang, Shaanxi, China. It is an intermediate stop on the Yinchuan–Xi'an high-speed railway and was opened with the line on 26 December 2020.

The station was initially known as Xianyang Beiyuan, but the name was changed prior to opening.

The station has two island platforms.

See also
Xianyang railway station
Xianyang West railway station

References 

Railway stations in Shaanxi
Railway stations in China opened in 2020